The performance of Bolivia during the Falklands War refers to all the acts that the country carried out during the time that the war in the Falklands Islands lasted. Bolivia had become in 1833 the first country in the Americas to protests the English invasion of the Falklands Islands.

Historia

19th century 
The history of Bolivia with the Malvinas Islands begins during the British occupation of 1833, since during that time Marshal Andrés de Santa Cruz Calahumana (who ruled Bolivia for a decade from 1829 to 1839) and once he heard the news of the English invasion of the islands, Santa Cruz decided to send a letter of protest to King William IV of the United Kingdom in which he stated that Bolivia only recognized the Argentine Republic as a territorial unit over the Malvinas. Said Bolivian letter was also sent to the Prime Minister of the United Kingdom at the time, Charles Gray, in addition to also sending another copy of the original to the city of Buenos Aires.

20th century

Bolivian Government and the Falklands Islands 

When the Malvinas War broke out on April 2, 1982, Bolivia was governed at that time by a military dictatorship under the command of Army General Celso Torrelio Villa. It is worth mentioning that some Bolivian soldiers were willing to help Argentina and a clear example of this were the statements to the press by the then commander of the Bolivian Air Force (FAB), General Natalio Morales Mosquera, who said the following:

British threat to Bolivia 
But the statements of the commander of the Bolivian Air Force did not go unnoticed by the British Embassy in Bolivia, which also spoke before the press and publicly asked President Celso Torrelio Villa to confirm once and for all whether Bolivia has also opted for starting hostilities against the UK. A few hours later, the news broke that England had privately and secretly warned the Bolivian government (in a threatening tone) to apply harsh economic sanctions to Bolivia, especially in the mining area, in case the country decides to enter the war in support of Argentina because it should be remembered that at that time the first and main pillar of the Bolivian economy was still mining.

It is in this way that, in order to avoid a possible trade embargo on the entire country, the lawyer and diplomat Gonzalo Romero Álvarez García, who at that time held the high position of Foreign Minister of Bolivia, decided to recommend that the Bolivian president not intervene in the war in favor of Argentina. but neither be against it but rather adopt a policy of neutrality in the face of the Malvinas conflict.

Bolivian Society and the Falklands Islands 

Although the Bolivian government had adopted a neutral position in the face of the conflict, the same had not happened with Bolivian society, since on May 26, 1982, the governor of the Province of Salta, Roberto Augusto Ulloa, together with the Bolivian Center of Salta and the Federation of Bolivian Ex-combatants of the Chaco War (1932-1935) announced to the Argentine press that at that time there were at least 25,000 Bolivian citizens who were willing to go to the battlefront, all offering themselves as volunteers. to defend the Malvinas Islands by repelling the English invasion.

Likewise, according to the "Rattenbach Report", it indicates that some young people of Bolivian nationality, as well as many Argentine citizens who descended from Bolivian parents who at that time were fulfilling their compulsory military service in Argentina, were sent to the battlefront by the military authorities. It is worth mentioning that although the exact number of Bolivians who participated in the war is still unknown at present, it is nevertheless confirmed that they were present in the war.

Although according to the Argentine journalist and writer Daniel Kon, who is the author of the book "Los Chicos de la Guerra" (The War Boys), he points out that several Argentine soldiers of Bolivian origin who were in the war were mistreated and discriminated against because of their physical features..

Peruvian Mirage III aircraft through Bolivia 

In June 1982, with the advance of the war and the already evident shortage of Argentine warplanes, Peru decided to collaborate militarily with Argentina by secretly sending it some 10 French-made Dassault Mirage III fighter planes belonging to the Peruvian Air Force (FAP).

Although Bolivia did not send military weapons to Argentina due to its neutral position that it had adopted after warnings from England, the Bolivian government was not against it either, and a clear example of this is when it decided to open Bolivian airspace so that planes Peruvians who were on their way to Argentina can safely fly over Bolivian territory to reach their final destination without being detected by Chilean radars. 

It is worth mentioning that the Peruvian planes took off from the La Joya air base located in the city of Arequipa in southern Peru and decided to fly through Bolivia to make a stopover in the Argentine city of Jujuy, finally arriving at their final destination in the city of Tandil. This is due to the fact that Chile had already adopted a position openly in favor of the United Kingdom and against the interests of Argentina, even transferring to England sensitive intelligence information of the different Argentine military movements during the war.

References 

Falklands War
Argentina–Bolivia relations
Bolivia–United Kingdom relations